The Piazza Cotton Gin is on the Frogmore Plantation at 11656 U.S. Highway 84, about  west of Ferriday, Louisiana in Concordia Parish, Louisiana. The building containing the cotton gin press was built c.1880, while the machinery was added c.1900. The gin itself is a system cotton gin, which was invented by Robert S. Munger.  This invention was the second major revolution in cotton processing (after the original gin was invented by Eli Whitney).  This example is one of the few (and perhaps the only one) left in existence.

It is a two-story building with ginning/pressing equipment.  It was moved to its current location from across the Mississippi River in Rodney, Mississippi in 1997.

The building is estimated to have been started c.1880 based on square nails used in its construction; some of the equipment bears 1883 and 1884 patent dates.

The property was listed on the National Register of Historic Places in 1999.

See also
Frogmore Plantation
Frogmore Mound Site, also located in Frogmore Plantation
National Register of Historic Places listings in Concordia Parish, Louisiana

References

External links
Official website

Industrial buildings completed in 1880
National Register of Historic Places in Concordia Parish, Louisiana
Cotton gin
1880 establishments in Louisiana
Industrial buildings and structures on the National Register of Historic Places in Louisiana
Cotton industry in the United States